The Ministries of Djibouti are headed by the Cabinet. It runs the day-to-day operations of the Government of Djibouti. The Council of Ministers is in turn appointed by the President, the actual head of government, on the proposal of the Prime Minister, who serves as its most senior minister.

References

External links
Chiefs of State and Cabinet Members of Foreign Governments

Politics of Djibouti
Government of Djibouti